Lockhart River may refer to:

Australia 
 Lockhart River, Queensland, a community in Queensland
 Aboriginal Shire of Lockhart River, a local government area in Queensland
 Lockhart River (Queensland), a river in Queensland
 Lockhart River, Western Australia

Canada 
 Lockhart River (Northwest Territories)

See also 
 Lockhart (disambiguation)